Platylesches hassani is a butterfly in the family Hesperiidae. It is found in the Democratic Republic of the Congo and Zambia.

References

Butterflies described in 2008
Erionotini